Hamlet RK is a Danish rugby club in Snekkersten near Helsingør.

History
The club was founded in 1981.

External links
 

Rugby clubs established in 1981
Danish rugby union teams